Maxime Nocher (born 2 June 1994) is a French professional kite surfer.

Nocher is a 10 time world champion and nine time French champion.

Achievements
 2006 
 Vice-champion d’Europe junior en freestyle

 2007
  Champion d’Europe junior freestyle

 2008 
 1er en coupe d’Europe course racing

 2009 
4ème au championnat de France freestyle
 1 er en coupe d’europe course racing
 vice-champion de France course racing
 1er au Hyères kite-show

 2010
 Champion de France junior course racing
 1er coupe d’europe course racing
 Champion de France junior freestyle

 2011
 Champion du Monde junior racing
 Champion de France junior Course racing.
 Vice Champion du Monde en planche de série.
 Vice Champion Europe tour course racing.

 2012 
 Champion du Monde de foil.
 Vice Champion du Monde de slalom.
 5ème Mondiale. 
 Vice Champion Europe tour course racing.
 Champion de France de race
 Coupe d'Europe race

2013
 Champion de France race
 Champion de France longue distance
 Champion du Monde de foil
 Coupe d'Europe de Race
 Recordman de la traversée saint Barth-Saint Martin à la voile.

2014
 Champion du Monde race -21 ans 
 Champion du Monde race toutes catégories
 Champion de France race
 Champion de France longue distance
 Vice champion de France foil
 Vice Champion de la Coupe du Monde de race
 Recordman de la traversée du Bosfor Turquie à la voile.

2015
 Champion du Monde race toutes catégories
 Champion du Monde Foil
 Champion de France race
 Vice champion de France foil

2016
 Recordman de la traversée Continent-Corse à la voile.

References

External links
 
 

1994 births
Living people
Male kitesurfers
French kitesurfers
21st-century French people